Liedtke is a German surname of several people including:

 Antonina Liedtke, Polish science fiction writer
 Bill Liedtke (1924–1991), American oilman, co-founder and president of Pennzoil
 Harry Liedtke (1882–1945), German actor
 J. Hugh Liedtke (1922–2003), American oilman, co-founder of Pennzoil who won the largest jury verdict in tort law history, brother of Bill Liedtke
 Jochen Liedtke (1953–2001), German computer scientist
 Max Liedtke (1894–1955), German journalist and army officer who protected Jews from the Holocaust
 Rainer Liedtke (1943–2012), German physician, scientist and entrepreneur
 Ulrike Liedtke (born 1958), German musicologist and politician
 Walter Liedtke (1945–2015), American art historian, writer and museum curator

See also: 

German-language surnames